Yu-Gi-Oh! It stars the cast of the Yu-Gi-Oh! television series in a new adventure that takes place between the third and fourth seasons of the show.

The film was first released in theaters in the United States by Warner Bros. Pictures under their Warner Bros. Family Entertainment label on 13 August 2004, and was released on DVD and VHS on 16 November 2004. The film was released in theaters in Japan by Toho on 3 November 2004 and aired on TV Tokyo on 2 January 2005. A remastered version of the film was released in theaters by 4K Media Inc. in 2018 on 11 and 12 March in the US, 25, 28 April, and 29 in Canada and 13 June in the United Kingdom, and was released on Blu-ray by Konami Cross Media NY and Cinedigm on 8 October 2019. Unlike the first three Pokémon films dubbed by the same company (which was licensed by Warner Bros. (including  under the both Kids' WB and Viz Media labels) in North America), the film was not currently licensed by Warner Bros. in the United States. The film was a critical and commercial failure.

Plot
Five thousand years ago, an heroic Pharaoh Atem imprisoned Anubis, the Egyptian lord of the dead, after he tried to destroy the world by persuading the kings to play the mysterious Shadow Games. In the present day, Anubis' tomb is uncovered by archaeologists, amazed with his strongest and most valuable treasure: the Pyramid of Light. At the same time, Yugi Muto completed the Millennium Puzzle which contains Atem's soul releasing dozens of monsters and the spirit of Atem possessed Yugi under the alias of Yami Yugi and banishes the monsters back to the shadow realm and a devastating spiritual force unleashes from the relic and liberates the Egyptian sorcerer. Anubis, now free, intends to conclude his plan.

Three years later, the Battle City Finals have recently concluded, and Yugi has achieved international fame by defeating his arch-rival Seto Kaiba and obtaining the three Egyptian God Cards: Slifer the Sky Dragon, Obelisk the Tormentor, and  the Winged Dragon of Ra. Kaiba, determined to defeat Yugi once and for all, turns to Maximillion Pegasus, the creator of the Duel Monsters card game, in order to obtain any new cards designed to defeat the almighty God Cards. Pegasus tells Kaiba that he has a card he is looking for, but will only give it to Kaiba if he can beat him in a duel. Kaiba defeats Pegasus and claims two cards, one of which was secretly planted by Anubis.

Meanwhile, Yugi and Téa Gardner after escaping the pro duelists and school principal that about to confiscate Yugi's three Egyptian God Cards go to the local museum where Anubis' corpse and the Pyramid of Light are on display. They meet up with Yugi's grandfather, Solomon, who reads a foreboding prophecy:

 The eye that sees what's yet to come
 Its vision shall be fulfilled
 Unless blinded by events predetermined
 Thus light and shadows both be killed
It is then that the vengefully dark spirit of Anubis attacks the group, with Yugi having a vision of Anubis himself manipulating Kaiba and Yami Yugi being hurt in a Shadow Game. He awakens to find Anubis and the Pyramid of Light missing. Kaiba's younger brother Mokuba arrives, and Yugi is taken to Kaiba's duel dome with his friends Joey Wheeler and Tristan Taylor in pursuit. Kaiba arrogantly and ignorantly forces Yami Yugi into a duel, unaware that Anubis is manipulating him into using one of the two new cards, Pyramid of Light, which covers the field in a huge replica of the actual pyramid and destroys the God Cards. Yugi, Joey and Tristan are sucked into the pyramid while Mokuba flees the crumbling building.

Yugi, Joey, and Tristan awaken within the Millennium Puzzle, finding Anubis' tomb within. Anubis reveals that his monsters will destroy the modern world. Yami Yugi and Kaiba continue their duel, each blow to their in-game Life Points draining away their physical energy. To make matters worse, Kaiba's Deck Destruction Virus sends more than half of Yami's deck to the Graveyard, leaving him with barely any cards, and attacks from his Blue-Eyes Ultimate Dragon and Blue-Eyes Shining Dragon (his second new card), both with 4500 Attack Points, drop Yami's Life Points to 200. Pegasus figures out what is going on and arrives in a helicopter to rescue Téa, Solomon, and Mokuba. Téa sends her soul into the Millennium Puzzle to aid Yugi, Joey and Tristan. Yugi finds the Dagger of Fate within Anubis' tomb, and uses it to destroy the all-seeing eye, as predicted by the prophecy.

When Kaiba deviates from Anubis' plan and attempts to destroy the Pyramid of Light, Anubis materializes, casts him aside, and takes command of the duel. Yami, reunited with Yugi, destroys the Pyramid of Light card with Blue-Eyes Shining Dragon and then uses Kaiba's planned strategy to summon the God Cards and end the duel by destroying Anubis.

However, Anubis transforms into a monster and allows any monster to become real when summoned. This proves to be his undoing when Yugi and Yami summon Blue-Eyes Shining Dragon to beat Anubis  with ease, ultimately destroying him for good. An injured Kaiba departs with Mokuba, with the promise to defeat Yugi next time they meet. Yugi thanks the spirit of Yami, and his three best friends for their strong enduring friendship which he claims makes him a true winner.

Voice cast

Soundtrack

Yu-Gi-Oh! The Movie Soundtrack feature various vocal artists (most notably The Black Eyed Peas, who contributed the song "For the People") from the English version. It was released on 10 August 2004, on RCA on Audio CD and Compact Cassette. The score for the film was never released.

Production

The English-language version of the film retains most of the regional changes made to the TV show, like the use of different character names (for instance, the character known in Japan as "Anzu Mazaki" is named "Téa Gardner" in other markets). Unlike the regular series, the trading cards seen in the film actually look like their real-life counterparts; the English-language series would normally edit them to alter their appearance.

The version of the film released in Japan featured thirteen minutes of additional animation. It utilized the characters' original names, along with the original soundtrack and sound effects heard in the Japanese version of the television series. Also, a different ending theme is used in the Japanese version, being the song Fire by groove metal band BLAZE.

Promotion
Attendees of the premiere got two of four free Yu-Gi-Oh! Trading Card Game cards (Pyramid of Light, Sorcerer of Dark Magic, Watapon, and Blue-Eyes Shining Dragon) when filmgoers purchased tickets for the film.

Novelization
A tie-in novelization for the film was released in 2004, written by Junki Takegami. The novel is divided into a prologue, 5 chapters, and an epilogue. It is virtually identical in terms of plot, save for a few minor changes, such as explaining that Akhenaden created the Pyramid of Light for his son Seto as a failed recreation of the Millennium Puzzle, and extra exposition, such as giving out detailed deck-lists for each character. The novel was never released and translated to English, and is now rare since it has gone out of print.

Release

Home media
The film was released on DVD and VHS on 16 November 2004.<ref name="YU">{{Cite web |date=11 October 2004 |title=Yu-Gi-Oh! The Movie Arrives on DVD and VHS November 16; Animated Film Based on the Top-Rated Television Series and Popular Trading Card Game |url=https://www.businesswire.com/news/home/20041011005817/en/Yu-Gi-Oh%21-Movie-Arrives-DVD-VHS-November-16 |access-date=28 July 2019 |website=Business Wire |publisher=Berkshire Hathaway}}</ref>

The film debuted on the Blu-ray format in the United States for the first time on 8 October 2019.

Box officeYu-Gi-Oh! – The Movie: Pyramid of Light opened at 2,411 screens across the U.S. and made a theater screen average of $3,934. By the end of the weekend, it made $9,485,494 and place #4 on the Box Office Top 10 behind Collateral, The Princess Diaries 2: Royal Engagement, and Alien vs. Predator, which opened up on the same day and took the #1 position. It is currently the #3 Japanese animated film in the US Box Office, after Pokémon: The First Movie and Pokémon: The Movie 2000. The film grossed $19,765,868 in the United States and Canada, with only $29,170,410 worldwide, making it a box-office bomb compared to the success of the first three Pokémon films dubbed by the same company.

Critical reception
The film was met with poor reception from critics. Criticism likened it to the Pokémon films in that it was only appropriate for fans of the franchise. Rotten Tomatoes ranked the film 68th in the "100 Worst Reviewed Films of the 2000s", with a rating of 5%, based on 66 reviews while the consensus reads, "Don't watch the TV show or play the card game? Then this movie is not for you." The film was the lowest-rated animated film on Metacritic until it was surpassed by 2017's The Emoji Movie, with an average of 15 out of 100, meaning "overwhelming dislike", based on 18 reviews. On Rotten Tomatoes, it is the second lowest-rated animated film of the 2000s behind Happily N'Ever After. In a retrospective review for the Radio Times Guide to Films, film critic Lucy Barrick awarded the film two stars out of five, describing the narrative as "largely incomprehensible" and the animation as "bog-standard".

Fathom Events re-releases
On 1 February 2018, it was announced by Fathom Events and 4K Media Inc. that the film would be getting a remastered re-release in 800 American theaters through 11 to 12 March.

In October 2018, a trailer for the Remasters preview for the current Yu-Gi-Oh anime, Yu-Gi-Oh! VRAINS, was shown alongside the film, in which the Yu-Gi-Oh'' film is on Blu-ray, which came out on 8 October 2018.

References

External links
  (US)
  (Japan)
 
 
 
 

2004 anime films
2000s fantasy adventure films
2000s Japanese-language films
Japanese animated fantasy films
Japanese fantasy adventure films
American children's animated adventure films
American children's animated fantasy films
American fantasy adventure films
2000s English-language films
2000s children's fantasy films
Anime films based on manga
4Kids Entertainment
Gallop (studio)
2004 films
Toho animated films
Warner Bros. films
Films scored by Shinkichi Mitsumune
2000s American films